Norma Waterson is an eponymous solo album by Norma Waterson. The album was nominated for the 1996 Mercury Music Prize and came a close second to Pulp's Different Class.

Track listing

Personnel

Musicians 
 Norma Waterson - Vocals
 Martin Carthy - acoustic guitar
 Eliza Carthy - Fiddle, backing vocals
 Richard Thompson - electric guitar, acoustic guitar
 Danny Thompson - double bass
 Roger Swallow - drums
 Benmont Tench - keyboards (2)

Technical 
 John Chelew - producer
 Larry Hirsch - engineer
 Joe Boyd - production consultant
 Tim Young - mastering

References

1996 albums
Norma Waterson albums
Hannibal Records albums